Svetlin Rusev (14 June 1933 – 26 May 2018) was a Bulgarian artist and a collector of art. He is known for the Svetlin Rusev Donative Exhibition, a permanent art exhibition in Pleven, including over 400 works of Bulgarian and foreign artist donated by him.

References

1933 births
2018 deaths
Bulgarian artists
People from Pleven